"Cell Therapy" is the debut single by the Goodie Mob, released as the lead single from their debut album, Soul Food. Fellow Dungeon Family members Organized Noize produced the song.

The song became a top 40 hit, peaking at number 39 on the Billboard Hot 100 while also topping the Billboard Hot Rap Singles at number one. It remains the group's only single to reach the top 40.

The song has also appeared on Goodie Mob's greatest hits compilation Dirty South Classics and Cee Lo Green's Closet Freak: The Best of Cee-Lo Green the Soul Machine.

Track listing

A-side
"Cell Therapy" (album version) – 4:43
"Cell Therapy" (album version clean) – 4:19
"Cell Therapy" (album instrumental) – 4:43

B-side
"Cell Therapy" (Sideeq Remix) – 4:43
"Cell Therapy" (a cappella) – 4:17
"Soul Food" (album version) – 3:56
"Benz or Beamer" – 4:15 (Bonus track performed by Outkast)

Charts

Weekly charts

Year-end charts

References

1995 singles
Goodie Mob songs
1994 songs
Song recordings produced by Organized Noize
Songs written by Sleepy Brown